Patrick Herbert (born 10 January 1997) is a New Zealand rugby league footballer who plays as a  for the Gold Coast Titans in the NRL.  

Herbert previously played for the New Zealand Warriors in the National Rugby League.

Background
Herbert was born in Whakatane, New Zealand.

He played junior rugby union for the Tamaki Rugby Club.

Playing career

2015
In 2015 Herbert made the switch to rugby league and signed with St. George Illawarra.

2016
In 2016 he re-signed with St. George, keeping him with the club until at least the end of 2018.

2018
In 2018 he signed a three-year deal with the New Zealand Warriors, effective from the 2019 NRL season.

2019
In Round 7 of the 2019 NRL season Herbert made his NRL debut for the New Zealand Warriors against the Melbourne Storm at centre, in place of the injured Solomone Kata.

2020
After Herbert dropped the ball over the line against Cronulla-Sutherland in round 10 of the 2020 NRL season, he struggled to regain a place in the New Zealand Warriors team and was subsequently released.

2021
During the first week of the NRL finals series, the Gold Coast Titans trailed the Sydney Roosters 25–24 with less than one minute remaining in the elimination final. After the Gold Coast Titans made a break, the ball was passed to Herbert, who then proceeded to throw a flick pass over the sideline despite two being supported by two fellow Gold Coast players, who could have potentially scored the match-winning try.

2022
Herbert made 18 appearances for the Gold Coast in the 2022 NRL season scoring one try. The Gold Coast would finish the season 13th on the table and miss the finals.

References

External links
Gold Coast Titans profile
New Zealand Warriors profile

1997 births
Living people
Gold Coast Titans players
Junior Kiwis players
New Zealand Māori rugby league players
New Zealand rugby league players
New Zealand Warriors players
Rugby league centres
Rugby league players from Whakatāne